TV5d is a local television station serving Tomohon, North Sulawesi, Indonesia and surrounding areas. The station was founded in 2006 by Netherlands-born entrepreneur, Dr Willie Smits, also chairman of the Masarang Foundation. The station is owned by Smits' wife Linneke Syennie Watoelangkow, also deputy to Tomohon City Mayor, in the period 2005-2010. TV5D celebrated its 2nd anniversary on January 14, 2008. TV5D rates as North Sulawesi's number one television news source. It primarily broadcasts from its headquarters at the Graha TV5 Dimensi in Tomohon, North Sulawesi, Indonesia, with services that are available to more than 4 million people in more than 8 regencies in North Sulawesi and North Maluku.

History 
TV 5 Dimensi was launched at 3:00 p.m. WITA on January 14, 2007, after a speech by Indonesian President Susilo Bambang Yudhoyono. Since its debut, TV 5 Dimensi has expanded its duration from 10 hours to 18 hours. Programs such as Sabuah Om Pala, Buka Jendela, Cerita Tentang Sahabat, have become highly popular local programs among North Sulawesi viewers.

TV Partnership 
TV 5 Dimensi has been joining partnership, and becoming affiliate station with Jak-TV.

See also 
 List of television stations in Indonesia

Tomohon
Television stations in Indonesia
Television channels and stations established in 2007